The 1990 Canoe Slalom World Cup was a series of five races in 4 canoeing and kayaking categories organized by the International Canoe Federation (ICF). It was the 3rd edition. The series consisted of 4 regular world cup races and the world cup final.

Calendar

Final standings 

The winner of each world cup race was awarded 25 points. The points scale reached down to 1 point for 15th place. If two or more athletes or boats were equal on points, the ranking was determined by their positions in the world cup final.

Results

World Cup Race 1 

The first world cup race of the season took place in Wausau, Wisconsin from 30 June to 1 July.

World Cup Race 2 

The second world cup race of the season took place in Savage River, Maryland.

World Cup Race 3 

The third world cup race of the season took place on the Augsburg Eiskanal from 11 to 12 August.

World Cup Race 4 

The fourth world cup race of the season took place in Bourg St.-Maurice from 17 to 18 August.

World Cup Final 

The final world cup race of the season took place at the Tacen Whitewater Course from 25 to 26 August.

References

External links 
 International Canoe Federation

Canoe Slalom World Cup
1990 in canoeing